Sony HDVS is a range of high-definition video equipment  developed in the 1980s to support an early analog high-definition television system (used in multiple sub-Nyquist sampling encoding (MUSE) broadcasts) thought to be the broadcast television systems that would be in use today. The line included professional video cameras, video monitors and linear video editing systems.

History
Sony first demonstrated a wideband analog video HDTV capable video camera, monitor and video tape recorder (VTR) in April 1981 at an international meeting of television engineers in Algiers, Algeria. 

The HDVS range was launched in April 1984, with the HDC-100 camera, which was the world's first commercially available HDTV camera and HDV-1000 video recorder, with its companion HDT-1000 processor/TBC, and HDS-1000 video switcher all working in the 1125-line component video format with interlaced video and a 5:3 aspect ratio.

The helical scan VTR (the HDV-100) used magnetic tape similar to 1" type C videotape for analog recording. Sony in 1988 unveiled a new HDVS digital line, including a reel-to-reel digital recording VTR (the HDD-1000) that used digital signals between the machines for dubbing but the primary I/O remained analog signals. The large unit was housed in a 1-inch reel-to-reel transport, and because of the high tape speed needed, had a limit of 1-hour per reel. Sony, owner of Columbia Pictures/Tri-Star, would start to archive feature films on this format, requiring an average of two reels per movie. There was also a portable videocassette recorder (the HDV-10) for the HDVS system, using the "UniHi" format of videocassette using 3/4" wide tape. The transport housing similar in appearance to Sony's D1/D2 Standard Definition Digital VTRs, but recorded analog HD. The small cassette size limited recording time to about 63 min.

The price of the HDD-1000 and its required companion HDDP-1000 video processor in 1988 was US$600,000. The metal evaporate tape (tape whose magnetic material was evaporated and deposited onto the tape in a vacuum chamber using physical vapor deposition) cost US$2500.00 per hour of tape and each reel weighed nearly 10 pounds. The high price of the system limited its adoption severely, selling just several dozen systems and making its adoption largely limited to medical, aerospace engineering, and animation applications.

Uses
The Sony HDVS system was used in the production of a 5-min feature film about Halley's Comet in 1986, titled "Arrival", and shown in US theatres later that year after being transferred to 35mm film.

The first drama film shot using the HDVS professional video camera was RAI's Julia and Julia in 1987, and the first HDTV television show was CBC's Chasing Rainbows, shot using the HDVS system in 1988. For the Genesis Invisible Touch Tour shows at Wembley Stadium in July 1987, the Sony HDVS system was used to film these shows, which were later released on VHS and LaserDisc in 1988 and DVD in 2003.

Montreux Jazz Festival in 1991 was filmed using Sony HDVS video system. Four HDC-300 3 cameras in 1125-line format (1080i today), 60 fps, and one Sony HDC-500 3 CCD prototype HDVS camera. 5 cameras were connected to 7-input HDS-1000T switcher and live mix was recorded to an HDD-1000 Digital 1" VTR.

World War II: When Lions Roared (also known as Then There Were Giants) is a 1994 TV movie, directed by Joseph Sargent, that stars John Lithgow, Michael Caine and Bob Hoskins as the three major Allied leaders. It was the first video production to be produced in the 1125-line high-definition television (HDTV) format. It was converted to NTSC for broadcast in the United States.

The HDVS brand and logo was still used by Sony in 2014 as "Digital HDVS" on their digital high-definition HDCAM-format cameras such as the HDW-750, HDW-F900, HDC-1550, "Power HAD" camera Sony HSC-300 Series, and XDCAM camera PDW-850, PXW-X500. By 2022, HDVS branded cameras have been discontinued and new camera models released don't have the HDVS logo.

Equipment

Camera system
 HDC-100 High Definition Color Camera (3 tube Saticon)
 HDC-300 High Definition Color Camera (3 tube Saticon) (Sony HDVS cameras weigh  on average.)
 HDC-500 High Definition Color Camera (3 CCD, world's first CCD-based HD video camera)
 HDCA-350 Camera Adapter
 HDCA-50 Camera Adapter
 HDCO-300 Camera Operation Control Unit (CCU)
 HDCO-350 Camera Operation Control Unit (CCU)
 HDCS-300 Camera Signal Processor
 HDCS-350 Camera Signal Processor

Camera system/Optional accessories
 HDCC-2/5/50/100 Multicore Cable (2m, 5m 50m, 100m)
 HDCD-50 Signal Distributor
 HDCR-350 Remote Control Panel
 HDM-140 14 inch Monochrome monitor
 HDM-145 14 inch Monochrome monitor
 HDM-90 9-inch Monochrome monitor
 HDVF-150 1.5-inch Viewfinder
 HDVF-30 3-inch viewfinder
 HDVF-500 5-inch viewfinder
 HDVF-700 7-inch viewfinder
 HDVF-75 7-inch viewfinder
 HKCF-750 Pan Tilt Table
 HKCF-90 Rack Mount Plate Kit
 HKCH-500 Shoulder Pad

VTR system
 HDD-1000 Digital 1" Type C VTR (Wide band (30 MHz) Y, PB, PR) with BVH-3000 like operation and appearance. It used two sets of separate flying erase, record and video heads with a higher linear tape speed than Type C videotape, of 80.5 cm/sec and a writing speed at the heads of 51.5m/sec, 30 Mhz luma and 15 Mhz chroma bandwidth and a 63-min recording time with 11.75 inch reels
 HDDP-1000 VTR Signal Processor (8-bit digital, required by the HDD-1000 for operation)
 HDV-1000 Analog VTR (based on Sony's BVH-2000 1" Type C standard-definition VTR, unlike most Type C VTRs it used separate video and video record heads.) It had a linear tape speed of 48.31 cm/sec and a writing speed at the heads, of 25.9m/sec, 20 Mhz luma and 10 Mhz chroma bandwidth and a 63-min recording time with 11.75 inch reels.
 HDT-1000 TBC/Signal Processor (required by the HDV-1000 for operation)
 HDDF-500 Digital Frame Recorder (G, B, R)
 HDDR-1000 VTR Control Unit
 HDDR-A1000 Audio Remote Control Unit
 HDDR-V1000 Video Remote Control Unit
 HDL-2000 Videodisc Player
 HDL-5800 Video Disc Recorder
 HDN-22000 NTSC Down-Converter
 HDV-10 Videocassette Recorder (UNIHI), with a tape speed of 119.7mm/sec and a writing speed at the heads of 21.4m/sec and a max. recording time of 63 minutes.

Optional accessories
 HCT-63 UNIHI videocassette, with 465m of 1/2 inch magnetic tape and a recording time of 63 minutes.
 HD-1D Series High Quality Video Tape (1-inch)
 HDIE-100 HD camera image enhancer
 HDIP-100 HD camera image enhancer power unit
 HDKF-508 Frame Memory Board (8 frames)
 HDSC-1000 Sync Converter
 HKDF-504 Frame Memory Board (4 frames)
 LBX-1000 Lightbox for use with the HDST-100T Telop Camera
 VF-503 Monitor Hood

Post-production equipment
 EBR System, Digital Electron Beam Recording (EBR) System (Video Tape to Film, Film recorder)
 HDS-1000 Switcher
 HDST-1000T Telop Camera (Saticon)

Optical Fiber Transmission System
(G/B/R analog component video, Analog audio x2; AES/EBU x6)
 HDFR-300 Optical Fiber Receiver
 HDFT-300 Optical Fiber Transmitter

Projection system
 HDI-120 Concave Screen-Type Projector System
 HDIH-1200/1200M High Definition Projector
 HDIH-2000/2000M High Definition Projector
 HDIH-3000/3000M High Definition Projector
 HDIR-550 High Definition Rear Projector
 HDIS-1200RK Rear Projection

Color monitors

 HDM-1220/1220E 12" Color monitor
 HDM-1230/1230E 12" Color monitor
 HDM-1730/1730E 17" Color monitor
 HDM-1820/1820E 18" Color monitor
 HDM-2820/2820E 28" Color monitor
 HDM-2830/2830E 28" Color monitor
 HDM-3720/3720E 37" Color monitor
 HDM-3830/3830E 38" Color monitor

References

External links
 Sony corp history page
 Sony corp history page 2
 Sony copy history page 3

Film and video technology
High-definition television
History of television
Japanese inventions
Audiovisual introductions in 1984
Sony products